Fulvio Testi (August 1593 in Ferrara – 28 August 1646 in Modena) was an Italian diplomat and poet who is recognised as one of the main exponents of 17th-century Italian Baroque literature. He worked in the service of the d'Este dukes in Modena, for whom he held high office, such as the governorship of Garfagnana. His poems tackle civic themes in solemn tones, showing Testi's lasting anti-Spanish and, consequently, pro-Savoia political passions. Accused of treason for having tried to set up diplomatic relations with the French court, he was imprisoned and died in jail soon after. One later literary critic wrote:
If he'd been born in a less barbarous age, and had had more time than he did to cultivate his talent, he would doubtless have been our Horace, and perhaps been hotter and more vehement and more sublime than the Latin man

Life
The son of Giulio and Margherita Calmoni, Fulvio studied literature and philosophy with the Jesuits at Modena, and then studied poetry privately at Bologna. His sonnets, circulating in manuscript, had already earned him a certain amount of fame by 1611, before entering the services of the Este chancelry, as a scribe. His first volume of verses, published at Venice in 1613 and dedicated to his patron and lord Alfonso III d'Este, followed the well-established vein of the Baroque pastoral idyll and courtly Mannerist marinismo. That same year he traveled to Naples and Rome, forming a friendship with Alessandro Tassoni, and returned to Modena in the summer of 1614. In the autumn he married Anna Leni.

His Rime published in 1617, anticipated by their dedication to Carlo Emanuele, Duke of Savoy, the anti-Spanish octaves they contained, which were composed in 1615 and better known under the title Il pianto d'Italia, and characterized the injuries being suffered by the Spanish hegemony in Italy, to such a degree that the Spanish Resident at the Duchy of Modena tendered a remonstrance, in consequence of which the printer Giuliano Cassiani was arrested and the edition suppressed. Testi having fled the Duchy, was pronounced contumaceous and exiled. Nevertheless, on receipt of a plea for forgiveness, he was pardoned by Cesare d'Este, 5 February 1619. In the following summer, the Duke of Savoy in question, apprised of the troubles Testi had undergone, enrolled him in the Savoyard Order of Santi Maurizio e Lazzaro, while the Duke acknowledged his literary gifts as virtuoso di camera.

Henceforth, Testi's career took him on a long series of travels of a diplomatic nature, notably to Vienna, Rome, Venice and Turin, with the result that in April 1635 he was awarded a feudal demesne that brought him the title of conte At the end of that year he was sent as ambassador to the court of Spain. Embarking 10 March 1636 at Vado, where he encountered an old acquaintance from Rome, Gabriello Chiabrera, his embassy in Madrid, which brought him the cross of the Order of Santiago, lasted exactly a year, though he would be sent again in 1638. Meanwhile, back in Modena by March 1637, Testi was made the Duke's Secretary of State. In 1640, stifled by court life (though he returned in 1642), with which he did was perhaps always considered a parvenu, he asked for and obtained from Francesco I d'Este the post of governor of Garfagnana.

Following further diplomatic missions, he undertook confidential inquiries through the Italian Cardinal Mazarin, to be transferred to the court of France. Upon discovery, in January 1646 he was committed to the prison of Modena as a traitor, where, after seven months' confinement, he died.

A hypothesis developed by Girolamo Tiraboschi suggested that Testi's imprisonment was motivated by the resentment of principe Raimondo Montecuccoli, to whom Testi would have dedicated a far from flattering ode; the poet Ugo Foscolo, absorbing Tiraboschi's thesis, recorded nevertheless that the ode in question, though dedicated tor Montecuccoli, indirectly affronted the Este.

Main works

Lyric poems
 
 
 Fulvio Testi, L'isola d'Alcina, 1626.

Political works

Letters
 
 Fulvio Testi, Lettere inedite in nome del duca Francesco I. a Francesco Sassatelli, luogotenente di Vignola, s.e., Modena 1841.
 
 
 Fulvio Testi, Lettere, 3 voll. (1609-1633, 1634–1637, 1638–1646),  a cura di Maria Luisa Doglio, Casa editrice Giuseppe Laterza & figli, Bari 1967.

References

Bibliography

External links
 
  Quotes on Italian Wikiquote

1593 births
1646 deaths
Italian diplomats
Italian letter writers
Italian poets
Italian male poets
Writers from Ferrara
17th-century letter writers
Baroque writers